The Reform Club of Hong Kong was one of the oldest political organisations in Hong Kong, existing from 1949 until the mid-1990s. Established by expatriates who were concerned about the Young Plan proposed by Governor Mark Aitchison Young in 1949, the Reform Club was the first semi-political party to contest in the Urban Council elections, with its longtime chairman Brook Bernacchi serving on the Council for about forty years.

It demanded expansion of the power of the Urban Council and elected representatives in the Legislative Council for years. Together with the Hong Kong Civic Association, they were the closest to opposition parties in Hong Kong active in the municipal electoral politics during the post-war colonial period. With the expansion of the franchise in the 1980s, the Reform Club gradually declined and was replaced by the more energetic political groups. The Club ceased to function after its chairman Bernacchi retired from the Urban Council in 1995.

History
The Reform Club was founded by expatriate barrister Brook Bernacchi in 1949 in the midst of the debate over the Young Plan, a plan for wide constitutional reform in Hong Kong. The immediate target of the Club was to campaign for direct elections to the Legislative Council of Hong Kong. Unlike the Hong Kong Chinese Reform Association, which was set up during the same time for similar causes, the Reform Club was dominated by expatriates.

For decades the Reform Club and the Civic Association dominated municipal politics as they provided most of the elected members of the Urban Council. It advocated more representative government in the territory and the improvement of public sector social services. In 1960, the two groups formed a coalition and sent a delegate to London to demand direct elections to the Legislative Council. The Reform Club adopted a modest stance amid the 1966 riots, opposing violent actions from both protesters and the police. In 1979, the Reform Club threatened to boycott elections if the Urban Council would not receive a majority of elected members and universal franchise was extended to all Hong Kong citizens. In 1982, it took part in the elections for the newly established district boards in the urban districts, which significantly extended the franchise.

Starting from the late 1960s, the Club's ability to monopolise Urban Council elections with the Civic Association eroded, in light of the emergence of the popular independent candidates. Before the expansion of the franchise, the Reform Club had 15 members in the Urban Council of 1983. But the Reform Club's influence in the Urban Council reduced during the 1980s. Following the 1989 municipal elections, only five Reform Club members remained due to its lack of grassroots support. The Reform Club and Civic Association were gradually supplanted by the new pro-democracy groups including the Hong Kong Association for Democracy and People's Livelihood and Meeting Point. When at the 1995 municipal elections Brook Bernacchi retired, the Reform Club ceased to be active in the Hong Kong political scene.

Notable members
Brook Bernacchi (founder)
Alison Bell
Chan Shu-woon
Elsie Elliott (later known as Elsie Tu)
Henry Hu
Kan Yuet Keung
Charles Edgar Loseby
Cecilia Yeung

Election performance

Municipal elections

District Board/Council elections

References

External links
Hong Kong Newspaper Clippings Online

1949 establishments in Hong Kong
1995 establishments in Hong Kong
Defunct political parties in Hong Kong
Political parties disestablished in 1995
Political parties established in 1949